The women's team foil was one of ten fencing events on the fencing at the 2000 Summer Olympics programme. It was the eleventh appearance of the event. The competition was held on 23 September 2000. 29 fencers from 9 nations competed.

Medalists

Main tournament bracket
The field of 9 teams competed in a single-elimination tournament to determine the medal winners.  Semifinal losers proceeded to a bronze medal match. Matches were also conducted to determine the final team placements.

Classification 5-8

Classification 9-11

References

External links
 Report of the 2000 Sydney Summer Olympics

Foil team
2000 in women's fencing
Women's events at the 2000 Summer Olympics